Timothy D. Beck (born January 18, 1964) is an American football coach and former player. He is currently the offensive coordinator at New Mexico State. He was previously an offensive analyst for the TCU Horned Frogs football program for the 2021 season. Beck served as the head football coach at Pittsburg State University in Pittsburg, Kansas from 2010 to 2019, compiling a record of 82–35. He led the 2011 Pittsburg State Gorillas football team to the NCAA Division II Football Championship. Beck played college football at Pittsburg State from 1985 to 1986 and was an assistant coach with the program from 1987 to 2009.

Head coaching record

References

External links
 New Mexico State profile

1964 births
Living people
American football defensive backs
New Mexico State Aggies football coaches
Pittsburg State Gorillas football coaches
Pittsburg State Gorillas football players
TCU Horned Frogs football coaches
People from Ness City, Kansas
Coaches of American football from Kansas
Players of American football from Kansas